Craig Williams (born 23 May 1977) is a Victoria, Australia based jockey. He has won multiple group one races in Australia and worldwide, including the 2019 Melbourne Cup.

Williams rode his first race in 1993. In 2011, he almost achieved a unique Australian horse racing triple, in winning the Caulfield Cup, Cox Plate and Melbourne Cup.  After winning the first two on Southern Speed and Pinker Pinker respectively, Williams was suspended for careless riding during the 2011 Bendigo Cup.  The horse he was scheduled to ride in the Melbourne Cup, Dunaden, went on to win with last-minute replacement jockey Christophe Lemaire on board.

In the 2012 Caulfield Cup, Williams rode Dunaden to an unprecedented victory. A few days before the race Dunaden had drawn the outside barrier (barrier 22, although after scratchings it became barrier 18), and was also the top weighted horse for the race, carrying 58 kg.  Dunaden had subsequently drifted in the betting odds, as no horse had ever won the Caulfield Cup from wider than barrier 15, nor carrying top weight.  The win also made it back-to-back Caulfield Cup victories for Williams. In 2019, Williams rode Vow and Declare to win the Melbourne Cup in his 15th start in the race.

As of early July 2021, Williams has ridden 1,939 winners, including 61 Group One winners. He has won the Scobie Breasley Medal five times: in 2006, 2007, 2008, 2009 and 2017.

References

External links
Jockey profile racingvictoria.net racingandsports.com.au

1977 births
Living people
Australian jockeys